De Soysa Park Stadium (formerly known as Tyronne Fernando Stadium) is a multi-use stadium in Moratuwa, Sri Lanka. It is currently used mostly for cricket matches. The stadium holds 15,000 people and hosted its first Test match in 1992. The ground opened in 1940 and gained Test status in 1979. Moratuwa, located just eight miles (13 km) south of Colombo is renowned for its carpentry, cricket and its philanthropists. Indeed it was the most famous of these families that initiated the development of De Soysa Park Stadium, when they donated the 5 acre (20,000 sq m) plot of land to the Urban Council in 1940, to develop the Sports Complex. An additional 2 acres were sold under its market value by another member of the family. The ground was named De Soysa Park and subsequently used mainly for Moratuwa Sports Club (MSC) and school competitions.

History

A. H. T. de Soysa
Albert Hildebrand Theodore de Soysa (14 March 1889 - 2 November 1959) was a Ceylonese entrepreneur and philanthropist. He was the second son of Solomon Peter de Soysa (1854-1906), the Managing Director of the business concerns of cousin Sir Charles Henry de Soysa and Dora Caroline Weerasooriya. He attended Trinity College, Kandy and went on to become its greatest benefactor by financing several building projects including the college hall.

In 1940, de Soysa initiated the development of the De Soysa Park as a venue for sports and recreation by gifting a 5 acre (20,000 sq m) plot of land and purchasing an additional 2 acres. It was intended for cricket, other sports and public use. It was again de Soysa that assisted the call for putting up the first stadium/pavilion in 1952. His other benefactions include the Ingiriya Hospital , the Gamini Central College and the Christ Church, Ingiriya (Kalutara District). He was a recipient of the Distinguished Auxiliary Service Medal of The Salvation Army.

Club Presidents and other benefactors
The club, its presidents D. H. L. De Silva, Dr. H. I. Fernando and local MP Wimalasiri De Mel took a keen interest in developing it further. In 1979 Moratuwa received public funds from the then Deputy Foreign Minister, Tyronne Fernando. A stadium was built, which could accommodate approximately 16,000 spectators.

International matches
The first international team to play at the ground was the West Indians in 1979. The pitch has traditionally favoured the batsmen, but it can break up and the ball then has a tendency to keep low. The first Test match at the ground was against Australia on 8 September 1992. Allan Border made 106 and Ian Healy 71 as the visitors scored 337 in the first innings and controlled the match thereafter. However half centuries from Aravinda De Silva and Hashan Tillakaratne ensured a draw for the home side.

The most memorable of the four Test matches - they were all drawn - at the ground was the third, against South Africa. On the last day Jonty Rhodes defied Muttiah Muralitharan to score 101* and keep the series alive. Bangladesh played their first ever ODI match here against Pakistan in the 1986 Asia Cup.

In recent times the venue is mostly used for the foreign teams to play their side games and for Sebastianites to play their home matches in the domestic season. In recent times the wicket has become rather low in bounce, is conducive to spin, but is generally favourable to the batsmen. It is also the venue for the Battle of the Golds, the annual big-match between Prince of Wales' College and St. Sebastian's College.

International five-wicket hauls

Key

Tests

ODIs

International Centuries
There has been five Test centuries scored at the venue.

See also
 List of Test cricket grounds
 List of international cricket grounds in Sri Lanka

References

External links
 ESPN Cricinfo profile on De Soysa Stadium
 CricketArchive profile on De Soysa Stadium
 Birth of De Soysa Park and Moratuwa Sports Club

Cricket grounds in Sri Lanka
Test cricket grounds in Sri Lanka
Buildings and structures in Moratuwa